is a Japanese actor. He has appeared in more than 40 films since 1984.

Selected filmography

Film

TV

Awards

References

External links 

1965 births
Living people
Japanese male film actors
Male actors from Tokyo